The Monmouth Hawks men's basketball team represents Monmouth University in West Long Branch, New Jersey, United States. The school's team currently competes in the Colonial Athletic Association. They are currently led by head coach King Rice and play their home games at the OceanFirst Bank Center. The Hawks had wins over five power conference opponents (UCLA, Notre Dame, USC, Georgetown, and Rutgers) and received votes in the AP poll for the first time ever during the 2015–16 season. They last appeared in the NCAA tournament in 2006.

Postseason

NCAA Division I Tournament results
The Hawks have appeared in four NCAA Division I men's basketball tournaments. Their combined record is 1–4.

NIT results
The Hawks have appeared in two National Invitation Tournaments. Their combined record is 1–2.

NCAA Division II Tournament results
The Hawks have appeared in two NCAA Division II men's basketball tournaments. Their combined record is 1–3.

NCAA Division III Tournament results
The Hawks have appeared in one NCAA Division III tournament. Their combined record is 1–1.

NAIA Tournament results
The Hawks have appeared in five NAIA Tournaments. Their record is 3–5.

Awards

All-Americans
 Rahsaan Johnson* – 2001
 Blake Hamilton* – 2005
 Justin Robinson* - 2016, 2017
(*) Denotes Honorable Mention

Metro Atlantic Athletic Conference Player of the Year
 Justin Robinson – 2016, 2017

Metro Atlantic Athletic Conference Coach of the Year
 King Rice – 2016, 2017

Northeast Conference Player of the Year
 Rahsaan Johnson – 2001
 Blake Hamilton – 2005

References

External links
Website